Mazie Keiko Hirono (Japanese name: , ; born November 3, 1947) is an American lawyer and politician serving as the junior United States senator from Hawaii since 2013. A member of the Democratic Party, Hirono previously served as a member of the United States House of Representatives for Hawaii's 2nd congressional district from 2007 to 2013. Hirono also served as a member of the Hawaii House of Representatives from 1981 to 1995 and as Hawaii's tenth lieutenant governor from 1994 to 2002, under Ben Cayetano. She was the unsuccessful Democratic nominee for governor of Hawaii in 2002, defeated by Republican Linda Lingle in the general election.

Hirono is the first elected female senator from Hawaii, the first Asian-American woman elected to the Senate, the first U.S. senator born in Japan, and the nation's first Buddhist senator. She considers herself a non-practicing Buddhist and is often cited with Hank Johnson as the first Buddhist to serve in the United States Congress. She is also the third woman to be elected to Congress from Hawaii (after Patsy Mink and Pat Saiki).

In 2012, Hirono was the Democratic nominee for the U.S. Senate seat being vacated by the retirement of Daniel Akaka. Hirono won the election, defeating Lingle in a landslide, 63% to 37%. She was sworn in on January 3, 2013, by Vice President Joe Biden. Hirono was the only person of Asian ancestry serving in the U.S. Senate from 2013 until 2017, when senators Tammy Duckworth and Kamala Harris were sworn in, representing Illinois and California, respectively. Although Brian Schatz is Hawaii's senior senator because he joined the Senate a week before Hirono, following the death of Daniel Inouye, Hirono's three terms in the U.S. House of Representatives make her the dean, or longest-serving member overall, of Hawaii's congressional delegation.

Early life and education
Mazie Hirono was born on November 3, 1947, in Fukushima Prefecture, Japan to Laura Chie Satō, a Japanese American, and Hirono Matabe, a Japanese veteran of World War II. Mazie's maternal grandfather, Hiroshi Satō, immigrated to Hawaii to work on a sugar plantation at the age of 16; her grandmother, Tari Shinoki, immigrated to Hawaii as a picture bride. After finding plantation work difficult, the couple opened a bathhouse on River Street in Honolulu in 1928. The couple had a daughter, Laura Chie, in 1924, and a son, Akira.

In 1939, Tari returned to Japan with the teenaged Laura and Akira; Hiroshi remained in Hawaii to run the bathhouse for two more years before joining his family in 1941. Laura felt out of place in Japan as one of the many Nisei Japanese Americans who emigrated with their returning Issei parents (barred from US citizenship or land ownership) before World War II and during the Great Depression. But although her brother returned to Hawaii after the war, she remained in Japan and married a veterinarian, Hirono Matabe, in 1946. Laura moved with her husband to southern Fukushima, and had three children, Roy, Mazie, and Wayne. Mazie, the middle child, was the only surviving daughter.

Mazie's father, Matabe, was a compulsive gambler and alcoholic who pawned even his wife's possessions for gambling money. Treated "like a slave" by her in-laws, Mazie's mother finally left the abusive marriage in 1951. Laura later recounted her point of decision: "My brother sent money to buy a school uniform for my son. My husband took the money, went to town and never came back home. It was getting closer to the start of school, so I went to look for him. I found out he had ordered an overcoat for himself with the money. He didn't need an overcoat in the spring. That's when I made up my mind to leave." After telling her in-laws she was going to take her children to school in her hometown, Laura left the house, never to return. Selling her clothes to pay the rail fare, she and the children moved back to her parents' home. Laura said, "My husband never came around once; my parents were supportive and took all of us in. My mother gave us money. I guess it all boils down to love."

The Satō-Hirono family decided to return to Hawaii, but under the U.S. quota system Tari and Hiroshi, as Japanese nationals without American citizenship or professional status, could not go with Laura, an American citizen. Thus the family was separated, with three-year-old Wayne staying behind with his grandparents and Laura returning to Honolulu on her own with Mazie and Roy in March 1955. After two years of hard work, she brought her parents and youngest son to Hawaii in 1957. "She determined that she had to get away [from her husband]...she wanted to put thousands of miles between them", Hirono said of her mother. "That took a lot of courage. I always tell my mom there is nothing I can do—hard as it is to be in politics...harder than what she did."

After first living with Mazie's uncle Akira, the family moved into a rooming house on Kewalo Street in Honolulu with one room, one table, three chairs and one bed. Laura recalled, "Mazie and Roy slept on the bed. I slept on the floor with a futon. The landlady was so nice. The rent was $35, but she charged us less because I didn't have a job." Laura began working for the Hawaii Hochi as a typesetter and also three nights a week for a catering company. Mazie worked in the school cafeteria and had a paper route. Though money was tight and the family was forced to move often, Laura kept them together. Mazie recalled that she and her brother used to get a dime once or twice a week from their mother. "We both had baseball piggy banks. My older brother spent all his dimes but I saved mine. But one day I came home and the dimes were gone. My mother had to use it to buy food."

Hirono never saw her father again, and he has since died. Laura became a newspaper proofreader in 1961 and retired from the Hawaii Newspaper Agency in 1986; Roy became a Hawaiian Electric supervisor. Wayne drowned in 1978, aged 26. Mazie's grandfather Hiroshi died in 1989, and her grandmother Tari died in 2000 at age 99.

Raised in Honolulu, Hirono became a naturalized U.S. citizen in 1959, the year Hawaii became a state. She attended Kaahumanu Elementary and Koko Head Elementary Schools. She graduated from Kaimuki High School, which at the time had a predominantly Japanese American student body. Hirono then enrolled at the University of Hawaii at Mānoa, graduating Phi Beta Kappa with a B.A. in psychology in 1970. She later attended Georgetown University Law Center in Washington, D.C., where she obtained her J.D. degree in 1978. Hirono then returned to Honolulu, where she practiced law.

Hawaii House of Representatives (1981–1994)

Elections
In 1980, Hirono was elected to Hawaii's 12th House district in a multi-member district with Democratic State Representative David Hagino. Hawaii eliminated multi-member districts, and after redistricting she ran for Hawaii's 20th House district and won. After redistricting again in 1984, she ran for the newly redrawn Hawaii's 32nd House district and won. In 1992, after redistricting, she ran in the newly redrawn Hawaii's 22nd House district. She won the three-candidate Democratic primary with 91% of the vote. She won the general election and served only one term in the 22nd district before retiring in 1994 to run for statewide office.

Tenure
From 1980 to 1994, Hirono served in the Hawaii House of Representatives, passing more than 120 laws. She was honored by a coalition of leaseholders as Legislator of the Year in 1984.

Committee assignments
From 1987 to 1992, she was Chair of the Consumer Protection and Commerce Committee.

Lieutenant governor (1994–2002)

Elections

1994
Hirono ran for lieutenant governor of Hawaii and won the Democratic primary, defeating fellow State Representative Jackie Young 65%–26%. In the general election she defeated three other candidates: Danny Kaniela Kaleikini (Best Party), State Representative Fred Hemmings (Republican Party), and Jack Morse (Green Party), 37%–31%–29%–4%.

1998
Hirono ran for reelection in 1998. She was challenged in the primary by Nancy L. Cook and defeated her, 89%–11%. In the general election Hirono defeated Republican State Senator Stan Koki 50%–49%, a difference of 5,254 votes.

Tenure
In 1994 Hirono joined the ticket of incumbent Lieutenant Governor Benjamin J. Cayetano and was elected to a historic administration led by the first Filipino American governor and first Japanese immigrant lieutenant governor. During her tenure as lieutenant governor, she was president of the National Commission on Teaching, America's Future, and the Hawaii Policy Group. She also spearheaded the first-in-the-nation comprehensive Pre-Plus program, a precursor to universal preschool education in the United States.

2002 gubernatorial election

Hirono originally planned to run for mayor of Honolulu in a potential 2002 special election created by the vacancy of incumbent Mayor Jeremy Harris, who was planning to resign in order to run for governor of Hawaii. But due to internal controversies, Harris dropped out of the gubernatorial election and remained mayor for another two years. Hirono switched races.

Hirono worked to gain the support of Hawaii Democrats in her primary against former State House Majority Leader Ed Case. After polling almost equally throughout the race, Hirono defeated Case in the September 21 Democratic primary, 41%–40%, a difference of 2,613 votes.

In the general election, Republican nominee and Maui Mayor Linda Lingle defeated Hirono 52–47%, becoming Hawaii's first female governor.

U.S. House of Representatives (2007–2013)

Elections

2006

On September 23, Hirono ran for  being vacated by incumbent Ed Case. The Democratic primary was very competitive. There were ten candidates, seven of whom served in the Hawaii Legislature. Hirono's advantage was that she was the only candidate who had held statewide office and as a result had the most name recognition. She led in fundraising helped by the endorsement of EMILY's List. She won with a plurality of 22% of the vote. State Senator Colleen Hanabusa finished second with 21%, 845 votes short of Hirono.

In the general election Hirono defeated Republican State Senator Bob Hogue, 61%–39%.

2008

Hirono won reelection to a second term with 76% of the vote.

2010

Hirono won reelection to a third term with 72% of the vote.

Tenure

In 2008, Hirono was named the national preschool advocacy organization Pre-K Now's "Pre-K Champion" for her efforts on behalf of pre-kindergarten legislation.

Hirono co-sponsored and signed the Prevention First Act of 2007. The act aimed to increase public access to contraception and government funding to support the use of contraception. It places an emphasis on informing and protecting women from unintended pregnancy.
On May 4, 2011, Hirono voted against the No Taxpayer Funding for Abortion Act, which would have prohibited federal health care programs from covering abortion costs, with exceptions for life-threatening cases.

In July 2011, Hirono voted for the Access to Birth Control Act, which mandates that pharmacies provide birth control to customers without undue delay. The ABP Act also ensures that customers seeking birth control can obtain it without being submitted to unwanted harassment or breaches in patient confidentiality.
EMILY's List, a Democratic pro-choice action committee, pledged support to Hirono for her history of supporting contraceptive and abortion policies during her term. Its endorsement helped Hirono in her 2012 senatorial race, contributing $129,714 to her campaign.

Committee assignments
 Committee on Armed Services
 Subcommittee on Personnel
 Subcommittee on Readiness and Management Support
 Subcommittee on Seapower (Chair)
 Committee on the Judiciary
 Subcommittee on Immigration, Refugees and Border Security
 Subcommittee on Oversight, Agency Action, Federal Rights and Federal Courts
 Subcommittee on Privacy, Technology and the Law
 Committee on Veterans' Affairs
 Committee on Energy and Natural Resources

Caucus memberships
 Congressional Asian Pacific American Caucus
 Congressional Wildlife Refuge Caucus
 International Conservation Caucus

U.S. Senate (2013–present)

Elections

2012

On May 19, 2011, Hirono announced her candidacy for the U.S. Senate seat left open by Daniel Akaka, who was retiring at the end of his term in 2012. She won the Democratic primary election on August 11, 2012. Hirono was endorsed as one of Democracy for America's Dean Dozen. The Republican nominee was former Hawaii Governor Linda Lingle. Hirono won the general election on November 6, 2012, with 63% of the vote. She is the first female senator from Hawaii, as well as the first Asian-born immigrant to be elected to the U.S. Senate. She was a part of the first completely non-Christian Congressional delegation from the state, which continued until the election of Mark Takai (an Episcopalian) in 2014 as Representative of Hawaii's 1st congressional district.

In the 2012 campaign Hirono raised $5.2 million, with approximately 52% of that from large corporations. Lingle raised $5.5 million, with 74% from large corporations. Hirono spent $5 million and Lingle $4.8 million.

2018

On November 6, 2018, Hirono was reelected with 71.2% of the vote, defeating Republican Ron Curtis.

Tenure
On December 12, 2012, the Senate Democratic Steering Committee announced that Hirono would serve on the Senate Judiciary Committee, giving her influence on matters ranging from approving nominations of federal judges to setting criminal-justice policy.

During the Brett Kavanaugh Supreme Court nomination hearings in September 2018, Hirono became an outspoken defender of Christine Blasey Ford after Ford accused Kavanaugh of sexual assault, telling men to "shut up and step up. Do the right thing for a change."

In the wake of the January 6 United States Capitol attack, Hirono called for the resignation of fellow senators Ted Cruz and Josh Hawley for their opposition to certifying the 2020 presidential election Electoral College count.
She also called for the Twenty-fifth Amendment to the United States Constitution to be invoked to remove Donald Trump from office.

In April 2021, Hirono sponsored and the Senate passed a bill attempting to decrease hate crimes against Asian Americans due to xenophobia associated with COVID-19. The vote was 94–1, with Senator Hawley (R-MO) the only one who voted against the bill.

In July 2022, Hirono joined in introducing the Youth Voting Rights Act, comprehensive legislation to enforce the Twenty-Sixth Amendment and expand youth access to voting. This legislation, led by Senator Elizabeth Warren, was also introduced in the House by Representative Nikema Williams.

Committee assignments (117th Congress)

 Committee on Armed Services
 Subcommittee on Readiness and Management Support
 Subcommittee on Seapower (Chair)
 Committee on Energy and Natural Resources
 Subcommittee on National Parks
 Subcommittee on Public Lands, Forests, and Mining
 Committee on Small Business and Entrepreneurship
 Committee on the Judiciary
 Subcommittee on Border Security and Immigration
 Subcommittee on Oversight, Agency Action, Federal Rights and Federal Courts
 Subcommittee on Privacy, Technology and the Law
 Committee on Veterans' Affairs
Joint Select Committee on Budget and Appropriations Process Reform

Caucus memberships
 Congressional NextGen 9-1-1 Caucus
Expand Social Security Caucus

Political positions

According to On the Issues, Hirono's voting history places her in the "left/liberal" camp. The American Conservative Union gave her a 2% lifetime conservative rating in 2020.

Abortion
Hirono has a 100% rating from Naral Pro-Choice America. She is also endorsed by EMILY's list for pro-choice women. At a Senate Judiciary Committee hearing, Hirono told the panel: "If you don't support abortion, don't get one, but leave everyone else to the painful decisions they have to make along with their physicians".

Hirono called the June 2022 overturning of Roe v. Wade "a horrific day in America". She also said, "This will go down as one of the worst decisions in the history of the Court."

Gun control
In 2016, she participated in the Chris Murphy gun control filibuster. Hirono expressed disappointment when the Democrat-proposed Feinstein Amendment (banning the sale of firearms to individuals on the terrorist watchlist) and the Republican-backed background check expansion and alert system (regarding guns being sold to terrorist watchlist suspects) both failed to pass the Senate.

Health care
On July 28, 2017, two months after undergoing surgery for stage-four kidney cancer, Hirono spoke on the Senate floor and voted against the so-called "skinny repeal" of the Affordable Care Act (Obamacare). MSNBC reporter Kyle Griffin filmed Hirono's speech and posted it on Twitter.

In January 2019, during the 2018–19 United States federal government shutdown, Hirono was one of 34 senators to sign a letter to Commissioner of Food and Drugs Scott Gottlieb recognizing the efforts of the FDA to address the effect of the government shutdown on the public health and employees while expressing alarm "that the continued shutdown will result in increasingly harmful effects on the agency's employees and the safety and security of the nation's food and medical products." Gottlieb said additional staff might be called in as needed.

Hirono is a supporter of Medicare for All.

Housing 
In April 2019, Hirono was one of 41 senators to sign a bipartisan letter to the housing subcommittee praising the United States Department of Housing and Urban Development's Section 4 Capacity Building program as authorizing "HUD to partner with national nonprofit community development organizations to provide education, training, and financial support to local community development corporations (CDCs) across the country" and expressing disappointment that Trump's budget "has slated this program for elimination after decades of successful economic and community development." The senators wrote of their hope that the subcommittee would support continued funding for Section 4 in Fiscal Year 2020.

LGBTQIA+ rights
Hirono supports transgender rights to serve in the U.S. military.

Telecommunications 
In April 2019, Hirono was one of seven senators to sponsor the Digital Equity Act of 2019, legislation establishing a $120 million grant program that would fund the creation and implementation of "comprehensive digital equity plans" in every state and a $120 million grant program to support projects developed by individuals and groups. The bill also gave the National Telecommunications and Information Administration (NTIA) the role of evaluating and providing guidance for digital equity projects.

Personal life

In May 2017, Hirono was diagnosed with stage 4 kidney cancer, which had spread to her seventh rib. The cancer was discovered in a chest X-ray in April before minor eye surgery. Hirono's right kidney was removed on May 17, 2017, with a Cyberknife procedure to treat the rib lesion. She returned to the Senate on May 22, 2017, and was reelected to a second term in 2018.

As of 2018, according to OpenSecrets.org, Hirono's net worth was more than $4.3 million.

In 2021, Viking Press published Hirono's autobiography, Heart of Fire: An Immigrant Daughter's Story. Marie Claire listed the book among its "25 Great Memoirs to Pre-Order Now".

Also in 2021, it was announced that Hirono would receive Japan's Order of the Rising Sun, Gold and Silver Star for her "significant contributions in strengthening bilateral relations and promoting legislative exchanges between Japan and the United States".

Electoral history

See also

 List of Asian Americans and Pacific Islands Americans in the United States Congress
 List of female lieutenant governors in the United States
 List of minority governors and lieutenant governors in the United States
 List of United States senators born outside the United States
 Women in the United States House of Representatives
 Women in the United States Senate

References

Further reading

External links

 Senator Mazie Hirono official U.S. Senate website
 Hirono for Senate campaign website
 
 

 Mazie Hirono   Video produced by Makers: Women Who Make America

|-

|-

|-

|-

|-

|-

|-

|-

|-

1947 births
21st-century American politicians
21st-century American women politicians
American Buddhists
American politicians of Japanese descent
American women lawyers
American women of Japanese descent in politics
Asian-American members of the United States House of Representatives
Asian-American United States senators
Democratic Party members of the Hawaii House of Representatives
Democratic Party members of the United States House of Representatives from Hawaii
Democratic Party United States senators from Hawaii
Female members of the United States House of Representatives
Female United States senators
Georgetown University Law Center alumni
Hawaii politicians of Japanese descent
Japanese emigrants to the United States
Lieutenant Governors of Hawaii
Living people
Members of the United States Congress of Japanese descent
Naturalized citizens of the United States
Politicians from Fukushima Prefecture
Politicians from Honolulu
University of Hawaiʻi at Mānoa alumni
Women state legislators in Hawaii
Recipients of the Order of the Rising Sun, 2nd class